The Holland Harbor Light, known as Big Red, is located in Ottawa County, Michigan at the entrance of a channel connecting Lake Michigan with Lake Macatawa, and which gives access to the city of Holland, Michigan.

The lighthouse is on the south side of the channel. There are two modern lights marking the ends of the breakwaters that extend out into the Lake Michigan beyond the lighthouse.

History

After decades of local requests that went unanswered, in 1870 the United States Lighthouse Board finally recommended construction of the first light at Holland Harbor.  It was thereupon approved by the U.S. Congress.

Text of the Michigan Historic Site marker:
When seeking a location for himself and his Dutch emigrant followers in 1847, the Reverend A. C. Van Raalte was attracted by the potential of using Black Lake (Lake Macatawa) as a harbor. However, the lake's outlet to Lake Michigan was blocked by sandbars and silt. Van Raalte appealed to Congress for help. The channel was surveyed in 1849, but was not successfully opened due to inadequate appropriations. Frustrated, the Dutch settlers dug the channel themselves. On July 1, 1859, the small steamboat Huron put into port. Here, in 1886, the government established the harbor's first lifesaving station. By 1899 the channel had been relocated and harbor work completed. This spurred business and resort expansion. In 1900 over 1,095 schooners, steamers and barges used the harbor.

The first lighthouse built at this location was a small, square wooden structure erected in 1872, after the U.S. Congress, appropriated $4,000 to the project. This was in large part due to Senator Thomas Ferry's influence. In 1880 the lighthouse service installed a new light atop a metal pole in a protective cage. The oil lantern was lowered by pulleys for service. At the turn of the century, a steel tower was built for the light and in 1907 the present structure was erected. Named the Holland Harbor South Pierhead Lighthouse, it has a gabled roof that reflects the Dutch influence in the area. The lighthouse, popularly referred to as "Big Red," was automated in 1932. When the U. S. Coast Guard recommended that it be abandoned in 1970, citizens circulated petitions to rescue it. The Holland Harbor Lighthouse Historical Commission was then organized to preserve and restore this landmark.

Except for its color, it is a virtual twin of the Kewaunee Pierhead Light on the Wisconsin side of Lake Michigan.

In 2007, the United States Department of the Interior announced that the Holland Harbor Light would be protected, making it the 12th Michigan lighthouse to have such status.

Accessibility
Public access to Big Red is somewhat limited due to the fact one must cross private property to see the lighthouse up close. However, there are no barriers for walking into the lighthouse area. The best vantage points that are easily accessible to the general public are from across the channel at Holland State Park. As of May 27, 2013 access by foot to the lighthouse is restricted to Tuesdays and Thursdays, from mid-morning to sunset.

See also
 Lighthouses in the United States

References

Further reading

 Bibliography on Michigan lighthouses.
 Crompton, Samuel Willard  & Michael J. Rhein, The Ultimate Book of Lighthouses (2002) ; .
 Hyde, Charles K., and Ann and John Mahan. The Northern Lights: Lighthouses of the Upper Great Lakes.  Detroit: Wayne State University Press, 1995.    .
 Jones, Ray & Bruce Roberts, American Lighthouses (Globe Pequot, September 1, 1998, 1st Ed.) ; .
 Jones, Ray,The Lighthouse Encyclopedia, The Definitive Reference (Globe Pequot, January 1, 2004, 1st ed.) ; .
 Noble, Dennis, Lighthouses & Keepers: U. S. Lighthouse Service and Its Legacy (Annapolis: U. S. Naval Institute Press, 1997). ; .
 Oleszewski, Wes, Great Lakes Lighthouses, American and Canadian: A Comprehensive Directory/Guide to Great Lakes Lighthouses, (Gwinn, Michigan: Avery Color Studios, Inc., 1998) .
 Penrod, John, Lighthouses of Michigan, (Berrien Center, Michigan: Penrod/Hiawatha, 1998)  .
 
 Putnam, George R., Lighthouses and Lightships of the United States, (Boston: Houghton Mifflin Co., 1933).
 United States Coast Guard, Aids to Navigation, (Washington, DC: U. S. Government Printing Office, 1945).
 
 U.S. Coast Guard, Historically Famous Lighthouses (Washington, D.C.: Government Printing Office, 1957).
 
 Wagner, John L., Michigan Lighthouses: An Aerial Photographic Perspective, (East Lansing, Michigan: John L. Wagner, 1998)  .
 Wargin, Ed, Legends of Light: A Michigan Lighthouse Portfolio (Ann Arbor Media Group, 2006).  .
 Wright, Larry and Wright, Patricia, Great Lakes Lighthouses Encyclopedia Hardback (Erin: Boston Mills Press, 2006)

External links

 Detroit News, Interactive map on Michigan lighthouses.
 
 Terry Pepper, Seeing the Light, Holland Harbor Light,
 
 

Lighthouses completed in 1872
Houses completed in 1872
Lighthouses completed in 1907
Houses completed in 1907
Lighthouses on the National Register of Historic Places in Michigan
Holland, Michigan
Buildings and structures in Ottawa County, Michigan
National Register of Historic Places in Ottawa County, Michigan
1872 establishments in Michigan